Huai Chin Si is a watercourse in Ratchaburi Province, Thailand. It is a tributary of the Mae Klong River.

Chin Si